The Togoland Campaign (6–26 August 1914) was a French and British invasion of the German colony of Togoland in West Africa, which began the West African Campaign of the First World War.

The main British and French force from the neighbouring colonies of Gold Coast and Dahomey (part of French West Africa) advanced from the coast up the road and railway, as smaller forces converged on Kamina from the north. The German defenders were able to delay the invaders for several days at the Affair of Agbeluvoe (affair, an action or engagement not of sufficient magnitude to be called a battle) and the Affair of Khra but surrendered the colony on 26 August 1914. In 1916, Togoland was partitioned by the victors and in July 1922, British Togoland and French Togoland were established as League of Nations mandates.

Background

Togoland, 1914
The German Empire had established a protectorate over Togoland in 1884, which was slightly larger than Ireland and had a population of about one million people in 1914. A mountain range with heights of over  runs south-east to north-west and restricts traffic between the coast and hinterland. The climate was tropical, with more rainfall in the interior and a dry season in August.

The Germans had made the southern region one of the most developed colonies in Africa, having built three metre-gauge railway lines and several roads from Lomé, the capital and main city. There was no port and ships had to lie off Lomé and transfer freight via surfboat. In 1905, a metal wharf equipped with a railway branch was inaugurated by the Germans to receive and trans-ship cargo directly onto trains.

The Lomé–Aného railway ran along the coast from Aného to Lomé, the Lomé–Blitta railway connected Lomé and Blitta, serving Atakpamé and the Lomé–Kpalimé railway, ran from Lomé to Kpalimé. Roads had been built from Lomé to Atakpamé and Sokodé, Kpalimé to Kete Krachi and from Kete Krachi to Mango; in 1914 the roads were reported to be fit for motor vehicles.

The colony was adjacent to Allied territory, with French Dahomey on its northern and eastern borders and the British Gold Coast to the west. Kamina was near the town of Atakpamé and had been completed in June 1914. The transmitter was a relay station for communication between Germany, its overseas colonies, the Imperial German Navy and South America. The Admiralty wished to prevent the station from being used to co-ordinate German attacks on shipping in the Atlantic. At the outbreak of war the Governor of Togoland, Duke Adolf Friedrich of Mecklenburg, was in Germany and his deputy, Major Hans-Georg von Doering was the acting Governor.

Gold Coast, 1914
Sir Hugh Clifford, the Governor of the Gold Coast, Lieutenant-General Charles Dobell, commander of the West African Frontier Force (WAFF) and Lieutenant-Colonel Richard Rose, commander of the Gold Coast Regiment, were absent during July 1914. William Robertson was the acting-Governor and Captain Frederick Bryant was acting-Commandant of the Gold Coast Regiment. The Gold Coast Regiment had one pioneer company, seven infantry companies, with a machine-gun each; a battery of four QF 2.95-inch Mountain Guns, amounting to  including  and about 330 reservists. The Defence Scheme for the Gold Coast (1913) provided for war against the French in neighbouring Ivory Coast and the Germans in Togoland; in the event of war with Germany, the colony was to be defended along Lake Volta and the north-eastern frontier, against raiding, the most that the Germans in Togoland were thought capable of. The plan also provided for an offensive across the lake into the north of Togoland, before making a thrust south to the more populated portion of the colony.

On 29 July 1914, a Colonial Office telegram arrived at Accra, ordering the adoption of the precautionary stage of the Defence Scheme and Robertson forwarded the information to Bryant the next day. Bryant dispensed with the Scheme, which had not been revised after the wireless station at Kamina was built and by 31 July, had mobilised the Gold Coast Regiment along the southern, rather than the northern, border with Togoland. Bryant had reached the same conclusion as Dobell and had already organised small expeditionary columns at Krachi and Ada and assembled the main force at Kumasi, ready to move in either direction.

Prelude

Anglo–French preparations

On 5 August, a day after Britain declared war on Germany, the Allies cut the German sea cables between Monrovia and Tenerife, leaving the radio station at Kamina the only connexion between the colony and Germany. The acting-Governor of Togoland, Doering sent a telegram to Robertson proposing neutrality, in accordance with articles X and XI of the Congo Act, which stated that colonies in the Congo Basin were to remain neutral in the event of a conflict in Europe. Doering also appealed for neutrality because of the economic interdependence of the West African colonies and their common interest in dominating local populations. On 6 August, the Cabinet in London refused the offer of neutrality.

Bryant, on his own initiative, after hearing that the French in Dahomey wished to co-operate, sent Captain Barker and the District Commissioner of Keta to Doering, with a demand the surrender of the colony and gave him  to reply. The next morning the British intercepted a wireless message from Doering that he was withdrawing from the coast to Kamina and that Lomé would be surrendered if attacked. A similar proposal for neutrality from Doering had been received by the Governor of Dahomey, who took it for a declaration of war and ordered an invasion. A French contingency plan to seize Lomé and the coast had been drafted in ignorance of the wireless station at Kamina, only  from the Dahomey border.

Advance to Kamina

Capture of Lomé 

Late on 6 August, French police occupied customs posts near Athiémè and next day Major Jean Maroix, the commander of French military forces in Dahomey, ordered the capture of Agbanake and Aného. Agbanake was occupied late on 7 August, the Mono River was crossed and a column under Captain François Marchand took Aneho early on 8 August. The moves were unopposed and Togolese civilians helped to see off the Germans by burning down the Government House at Sebe.

Repairs began on the Aného–Lomé railway and the French advanced to Porto Seguro (now Agbodrafo) and Togo before stopping the advance, once it was clear that Lomé had been surrendered to British forces. On 8 August, the emissaries took command of fourteen British soldiers and police from Aflao; a telegraph operator arrived by bicycle and repaired the line to Keta and Accra.

The British flag was raised and on 9 August, parties of troops arrived, having marched  in exhausting heat. Over the border, Bryant had arranged to move the main force by sea and embarked on the Elele on 10 August. Three other companies had been ordered to Kete Krachi, to begin a land advance to Kamina. Elele arrived off Lomé on 12 August and the force disembarked through the surf. Arrangements were made with the French for a converging advance towards Atakpamé by the British and the French from Aného, a French column under Maroix from Tchetti in the north and the British column at Kete Krachi (Captain Elgee). Small British forces on the northern border were put under the command of Maroix and ordered to move south, as about  cavalry were ordered across the northern border from Senegal and Niger, to advance on Mango from  The British force at Lomé comprised   police and volunteers, who were preparing to advance inland when Bryant received news of a German foray to Togblekove.

Skirmish at Bafilo

The skirmish of Bafilo took place between a company of French troops and German  in north-east Togoland on 13 August. The French company retreated after facing greater resistance than expected.

Advance from Lomé
After the capture of Lomé on the coast, Bryant was promoted to lieutenant-colonel, made commander of all Allied forces in the operation and landed at Lomé on 12 August, with the main British force of soldiers, carriers, police and volunteers. As preparations began for the advance northwards to Kamina, Bryant heard that a German party had travelled south by train the day before. Bryant detached half an infantry company on 12 August and sent another  companies forward the next day, to prevent further attacks. By the evening, "I" Company had reached Tsévié; scouts reported that the country south of Agbeluvhoe was clear of German troops and the main force had reached Tabligbo.

At  "I" Company began to advance up the road to Agbeluvoe. The relatively harsh terrain of bushland and swamp impeded the Allied push to Kamina, by keeping them on the railway and the road, which had fallen into disrepair and was impassable by wheeled vehicles. Communication between the parties was difficult, because of the intervening high grass and thick scrub. In the afternoon the British advanced guard met German troops near the Lili river, who blew the bridge and dug in on a ridge on the far side.

Affair of Agbeluvoe

The demolitions and the delaying action held up the advance until ; the force spent the night at Ekuni rather than joining "I" Company as intended. A section was sent to cut off the train and the rest of "I" Company pressed on to Agbeluvoe. Pfähler was killed and a quarter of the German force became casualties.

Affair of Khra 

Despite the skirmish in the north-west at Bafilo and the Affair of Agbeluvoe, Allied forces advancing towards the German base at Kamina had not encountered substantial resistance. The last natural barrier south of Kamina was the Khra River, where Doering chose to make a stand. The railway bridge over the river was destroyed and the approaches to the river and village were mined. On 21 August, British scouts found   entrenched on the north bank of the river. The West African Rifles, supported by French forces from the east, assembled on the south bank and during 22 August Bryant ordered attacks on the German entrenchments. The British were repulsed and suffered  Lieutenant George Thompson became the first British officer to be killed in action in the First World War.

Although the Germans had repelled the Allied force from an easily supplied, fortified position, French troops were advancing from the north and east towards Kamina unchecked and a British column was advancing on the station from Kete Krachi in the west. On the morning of 23 August, the British found that the German trenches had been abandoned. The Germans had withdrawn to the wireless station and during the night of  explosions were heard from the direction of Kamina. French and British forces arrived at Kamina on 26 August, to find that the nine radio towers had been demolished and the electrical equipment destroyed. Doering and   surrendered the colony to Bryant; the rest of the German force had deserted.

Aftermath

Analysis

The first military operations of British soldiers during the First World War occurred in Togoland and ended soon after British operations began in Europe. In December 1916, the colony was divided into British and French occupation zones, which cut through the German administrative divisions and civilian boundaries. Both powers sought a new partition and in 1919, during the Paris Peace Conference, Article 22 of the Treaty of Versailles distributed the former German colonies between the Allies.

In July 1922, British Togoland and French Togoland were created from former German colony, as League of Nations mandates. The French acquisition consisted of about 60 per cent of the colony, including the coast. The British received the smaller, less populated and less developed portion of Togoland to the west. The part under British administration united with Ghana upon its independence in 1957; French Togoland gained independence in 1960 as the Togolese Republic. The surrender of Togoland marked the beginning of the end for the German colonial empire, which lost all of its overseas possessions by conquest during the war or under Article 22.

Casualties
The British suffered  in the campaign, the French about  the  An unknown number of troops and carriers deserted on both sides. Lieutenant George Thompson of the 1st Battalion. Royal Scots, was the first British officer killed in the First World War. Thompson is buried at Walhalla Cemetery near Atakpamé. The German hospital at Lomé was commandeered by the British and was expanded to provide 27 "European" and 54 "native" beds. Four German nurses and 27 other staff had been left behind when the Germans withdrew inland and remained at work, supervised by Dr. Le Fanu. Six European and 45 "native" wounded were admitted. One wounded man died, despite the Germans using non-military ammunition, which caused severe wounds. Field hospitals were established along the lines of communication and wounded were swiftly evacuated from Khra by an ambulance train which was running two days after the engagement. Wounded and ill prisoners of war were treated on a ship, supervised by Dr. Berger, a German medical officer.

Notes

Footnotes

References

Books

Journals

Websites

Further reading

Books

Journals

Websites

External links

 L'histoire Vécue : Sokodé, 1914 les Allemands Évacuent le Nord-Togo (French)
 La Guerre de 1914 au Togo vue par un combattant Allemand with campaign map
  in Togo and Cameroon with photographs (German)
 Le centenaire de Lomé, capitale du Togo (French)
 An Old Coaster Comes Home: Chapter 5, Rattray’s War
 Togoland 1914: The Anglo-French Invasion
  uniforms

Military history of Togo
Battles of World War I involving Germany
Battles of World War I involving the United Kingdom
Battles of World War I involving France
African theatre of World War I
20th century in Togo
Togoland
1914 in Africa
Conflicts in 1914
Campaigns and theatres of World War I
August 1914 events